Mayfield High School is a public secondary school in Mayfield, Kentucky, and is the only high school of the Mayfield Independent School District.

History
Mayfield Independent City School District was established on July 1, 1908, with the selection and meeting of its first Board Members, organized by Mr. W.J. Webb. The first official school year as an independent school district was the 1908–1909 school year. The original location of Mayfield High School was on West Walnut Street School which opened in September 1908, and in 1909 the high school moved to the old West Kentucky College Building.

A new stadium was built behind the high school and dedicated on November 6, 1925, at the Madisonville/Mayfield Game. Up to this point, games were played at Cyclone Park, which was in the far north corner of what was Maplewood Cemetery.

In 1966, Dunbar High School, the school for black students in the Mayfield area, was closed and the students enrolled in Mayfield High School by court order. Mayfield High School moved to its current building in 1974.

The school was used as a safe shelter for survivors during the 2021 tornado, which destroyed much of Mayfield.

Athletics
Mayfield High School has won twelve KHSAA football championships (1977, 1978, 1985, 1986, 1993, 1995, 2002, 2010, 2012, 2013, 2014, and 2015).

Mayfield has been State Runner up 11 times(1976, 1987, 1989, 1991, 1992, 1998, 2005, 2009, 2011, 2017, and 2018), and has an additional 15 appearances in the State Final Four (1967, 1969, 1981, 1983, 1984, 1988, 1990, 1994, 1996, 2000, 2001, 2003, 2004, 2006, 2016).

Mayfield has not had a losing season since 1963.

Mayfield has a State best in both District Championships (41), and Regional Championships (36).

Following the 2019 season, Mayfield is third in the state in all-time football victories with 900. Only Highlands (901) and Male (906) have more victories. 900 wins is also good for 4th most wins nationwide.  Valdosta, GA has (932).

The football rivalry between Mayfield and Paducah Tilghman began in 1911 and is the second oldest rivalry in the state of Kentucky.

References

External links
Mayfield High School

Public high schools in Kentucky
Schools in Graves County, Kentucky